Schout is a Dutch surname derived from the former occupation of schout, local official appointed to carry out administrative, law enforcement and prosecutorial tasks. Notable people with this surname include:

Cornelis Jacobsz Schout (c.1570 – after 1621), was a Dutch Golden Age member of the Haarlem schutterij
Jacob Cornelisz Schout (c.1600 – after 1627), was a Dutch Golden Age member of the Haarlem schutterij
Loth Schout (1600 – 1655), was a Dutch Golden Age brewer of Haarlem
Pieter Schout (c1610 – after 1648), was a Dutch Golden Age member of the Haarlem schutterij
Pieter Jacobsz Schout (1570–1645), was a Dutch Golden Age mayor of Haarlem

See also

Dutch-language surnames